National General Corporation (NGC) was a theater chain holding company, film distribution and production company and was considered one of the "instant majors".  It was in operation from 1951 to 1974.

Divisions
Its division National General Pictures (NGP) was a production company which was active between 1967 and 1973. NGP produced nine motion pictures in-house. The company was a division of the National General Corporation (NGC) which started as the spun out Fox Theatre chain of movie houses, which were later sold to the Mann Theatres Corporation.

National General had its own record label, National General Records, that operated for at least three years and was distributed by Buddah Records.

History

National General Corporation was a film distribution network and the successor of 20th Century Fox's theater division with 550 theaters when spun off in 1951 and reduced in half by court order six years later.

National General entered distribution in 1966 under a three-year waiver from the consent decrees with six distribution offices. In 1967, the CBS television network decided to produce their own films for theatrical release through their production unit Cinema Center Films, which were released through National General.

National General also acquired Sy Weintraub's Banner Productions in 1967 which was producing Tarzan films and the TV series. NGC had also entered theatrical film production under Charles Boasberg in 1967 as National General Pictures (NGP). The ABC television network had done the same thing with Cinerama in the formation of another instant major partnership. In 1969, after a request for an indefinite waiver, the consent decree waiver was extended for another three years. NGC gained another production partner in 1969 with the formation of First Artists Productions (FAP).

The company tried to acquire Warner Bros. in 1969, but the deal was rejected on antitrust grounds by the Justice Department, and NGP was closed in 1970. By 1970, all the instant majors had each captured 10% of the market.

Following Cinema Center's closure, NGC was taken over by American Financial Corporation in 1972, but continued distributing films until 1973. In November 1973, American Financial sold NGC/NGP's releasing contracts and film library to Warner Bros.  National General, then just containing 240 theaters, were sold in 1973 to Mann Theatres.

Partial list of film titles

1960s

1970s

References

Cook, David A. (2000). Lost Illusions: American Cinema in the Shadow of Watergate and Vietnam, 1970-1979. University of California Press.

 
20th Century Studios
Warner Bros.
Film distributors of the United States
Film production companies of the United States
Entertainment companies based in California
Companies based in Los Angeles
Entertainment companies established in 1951
Entertainment companies disestablished in 1974
1951 establishments in California
1974 disestablishments in California